Speiredonia cymosema is a species of moth of the family Erebidae first described by George Hampson in 1926. It is found in Assam, Sikkim and Malaya.

External links
 

Moths described in 1926
Speiredonia